Erich Weishaupt (born 16 May 1952 in Kaufbeuren) is an ice hockey player who played for the West German national team. He won a bronze medal at the 1976 Winter Olympics.

References

External links
 
 
 
 

1952 births
Living people
Berliner SC players
Düsseldorfer EG players
ESV Kaufbeuren players
Ice hockey players at the 1976 Winter Olympics
Olympic ice hockey players of West Germany
West German ice hockey goaltenders
Olympic medalists in ice hockey
Olympic bronze medalists for West Germany
Medalists at the 1976 Winter Olympics
People from Kaufbeuren
Sportspeople from Swabia (Bavaria)